Oriane Lassus (born in 1987) is a French author and cartoonist, as well as an illustrator.

Biography

Since 2009, Lassus has contributed to the Spongiculture blog in which she goes through her daily life against a backdrop of acerbic humour. The project won the “Blog Revelation Prize” two years later, at the Angoulême International Comics Festival.

After a Master's degree in illustration at the Académie Royale des Beaux-Arts in Brussels, Lassus published her first comic book,  (Vraoum, 2012). The book explores the individual micro-events that affect the family unit.

Lassus regularly participates in the  artist residencies organized in Arc-et-Senans, which bring together each year a selection of authors among the most innovative of the alternative literary scene.

Since 2014, Lassus has collaborated with the children's magazine, in which she publishes the story , honored in the youth selection of the Angoulême International Comics Festival 2018 and the subject of an exhibition in the Pavillon Jeunes Talents (young talents pavilion).

In 2016, the comic  was published by Arbitraire. In it, Lassus highlights the situation of those women who choose not to have children.

Awards and honors
 2011: Blog Revelation Prize for Spongiculture, Angoulême International Comics Festival
 2020:  (EESI) prize

Expositions
 "Le Meilleurissime Repaire de la Terre", Festival d'Angoulême 2018, Pavillon Jeunes Talents, January 2018
 "Oriane Lassus : Lauréate du Prix de l’ÉESI 2020, Exposition personnelle", Éesi Angoulême, 30 January to 15 February 2020

Selected works
 Ça va derrière?, Vraoum, 2012
 Immobilerie Pointure, Super Structure, 2013
 Quoi de plus normal qu'infliger la vie?, Arbitraire, 2016
Première fraîcheur, Arbitraire, 2017
 Le Meilleurissime Repaire de la Terre, Biscoto, 2017
Les Gardiennes du grenier, Biscoto, 2020

References

1987 births
Living people
21st-century French writers
French cartoonists
French illustrators
21st-century French women writers
French women cartoonists
French women illustrators
French bloggers
Internet culture
Académie Royale des Beaux-Arts alumni
French comics artists
French female comics artists
French comics writers